Little yus (Ѧ ѧ) and big yus (Ѫ ѫ), or jus, are letters of the Cyrillic script representing two Common Slavonic nasal vowels in the early Cyrillic and Glagolitic alphabets. Each can occur in iotated form (Ѩ ѩ, Ѭ ѭ), formed as ligatures with the decimal i (І). Other yus letters are blended yus (Ꙛ ꙛ), closed little yus (Ꙙ ꙙ) and iotated closed little yus (Ꙝ ꙝ).

Phonetically, little yus represents a nasalized front vowel, possibly , while big yus represents a nasalized back vowel, such as IPA . This is also suggested by the appearance of each as a 'stacked' digraph of 'Am' and 'om' respectively.

The names of the letters do not imply capitalization, as both little and big yus exist in majuscule and minuscule variants.

Disappearance 

All modern Slavic languages that use the Cyrillic alphabet have lost the nasal vowels (at least in their standard varieties), making Yus unnecessary.

In Bulgarian and Macedonian 
Big Yus was a part of the Bulgarian alphabet until 1945. However by then, in the eastern dialects, the back nasal was pronounced the same way as ъ . Because the language is based mainly on them, the western 
pronunciations were deemed unliterary, and the letter was gone.

There were some Bulgarian and Macedonian dialects spoken around Thessaloniki and Kastoria in northern Greece (Kostur dialect, Solun dialect) that still preserve a nasal pronunciation e.g.  ("Where are you going, dear child?"), which could be spelled pre-reform as "" with big and little yus.

On a visit to Razlog, in Bulgaria's Pirin Macedonia, in 1955, the Russian dialectologist Samuil Bernstein noticed that the nasal pronunciation of words like  (hand),  (child) could still be heard from some of the older women of the village. To the younger people, the pronunciation was completely alien; they would think that the old ladies were speaking Modern Greek.

In Russian 
In Russia, the little Yus came to be pronounced as an iotated  in the middle or at the end of a word and therefore came to represent that sound also elsewhere; the modern letter  is an adaptation of its cursive form of the 17th century, enshrined by the typographical reform of 1708. (That is also why  in Russian often corresponds to nasalized  in Polish; cf. Russian ; Polish .)

In Polish 
In Polish, which is a Slavic language written in the Latin alphabet, the letter Ę ę has the phonetic value of little Yus, and Ą ą has that of big Yus. The iotated forms are written ię/ję and ią/ją, respectively. However, the phonemes written ę and ą are not directly descended from those represented by little and big yus but developed after the original nasals merged in Polish and then diverged again. (Kashubian, the closest language to Polish, uses the letter ã  instead of ę.)

In Romanian 
Little and big yuses can also be found in the Romanian Cyrillic alphabet, used until 1862.

One of the first transcriptions of the big yus as î in Romanian is found in Samuel Klain, Acathist, Sibii, 1801.

In Slovak 
Little yus in the Slovak alphabet has been substituted by a (desať, načať), e (plesať), iotated ia (žiadať, kliatba, mesiac), ie (bdieť) and ä in several cases (pamäť, päť, svätý). Big yus is transliterated and pronounced as u, or accented ú (budeš, muž, mučeník, ruka, navyknúť, pristúpiť, púť, usnúť). Iotated, and closed iotated form of little yus occur as ja (e.g. jazyk, svoja, javiť, jasle).

In Ruthenian 
In Ruthenian language, little yus was used to transcribe the sound ja (as in руска(ѧ) мова ("Ruthenian language") or ѧзыкъ ("language")). This evolved into and corresponded with the letter я in the descendant languages of Belarusian, Ukrainian, and Rusyn.

In Interslavic 

The Interslavic language, a zonal, constructed, semi-artificial language based on Proto-Slavic and Old Church Slavonic modified based on the commonalities between living Slavic languages, allows (though does not encourage it for intelligibility purposes) to use both the little and big yus when writing in the scientific variety of its Cyrillic script. The letters correspond directly to their etymological values from Proto-Slavic, but do not retain the nasal pronunciation, instead going for one aiming to convey the "middle-ground" sounds found in etymologically corresponding letters in living Slavic languages. The little yus corresponds to the Latin letter "ę", while the big yus to "ų" in the etymological Latin script. 

The iotated versions are not part of the standard scientific vocabulary, where the yuses are instead accompanied by the Cyrillic letter "ј", also used in the modern Serbian alphabet, though their use is optionally permissible for aesthetic reasons if one opts for using the more standard iotated vowels in their writing, so that consistency is preserved.

As of May 2019, no official "scientific Cyrillic" is endorsed by the Interslavic Commission for the reason that while Latin is easier to modify by simply adding diacritics, Cyrillic requires completely distinct graphemes. That is very likely to significantly hamper intelligibility for first-time readers, so yuses should not be used in writing when aiming to convey an easily understandable message.

Related letters and other similar characters
 Я я : Cyrillic letter Ya
 Ѣ ѣ : Cyrillic letter Yat
 Ę ę : Latin letter E with ogonek - a Polish letter
 Ą ą : Latin letter A with ogonek - a Polish letter

Computing codes

References

Cyrillic ligatures